Mossaâb Sassi (born 12 March 1990) is a Tunisian footballer who currently plays as a forward for US Tataouine .

On 27 July 2021, Sassi joined US Tataouine.

References

External links
 

1990 births
Living people
Tunisian footballers
Tunisian expatriate footballers
AS Ariana players
Étoile Sportive du Sahel players
CA Bizertin players
CS Sfaxien players
CS Hammam-Lif players
JS Kairouan players
Hetten FC players
Al-Nahda Club (Saudi Arabia) players
US Tataouine players
Tunisian Ligue Professionnelle 1 players
Saudi First Division League players
Expatriate footballers in Saudi Arabia
Tunisian expatriate sportspeople in Saudi Arabia
Association football defenders